In cryptography, SHARK is a block cipher identified as one of the predecessors of Rijndael (the Advanced Encryption Standard).

SHARK has a 64-bit block size and a 128-bit key size. It is a six-round SP-network which alternates a key mixing stage with linear and non-linear transformation layers. The linear transformation uses an MDS matrix representing a Reed–Solomon error correcting code in order to guarantee good diffusion. The nonlinear layer is composed of eight 8×8-bit S-boxes based on the function F(x) = x−1 over GF(28).

Five rounds of a modified version of SHARK can be broken using an interpolation attack (Jakobsen and Knudsen, 1997).

See also
 KHAZAD
 Square

References

External links
 SCAN's entry for SHARK

Block ciphers